Yasmin Vossoughian is a television journalist who currently is a weekend news anchor on MSNBC.

Vossoughian's regular anchor time slots are on Saturdays and Sundays from 2 p.m. to 4 p.m., hosting Yasmin Vossoughian Reports.

She previously co-anchored "Morning Joe First Look," also on MSNBC, at 5 a.m. on weekdays.  Prior to joining MSNBC she was employed by the CNN organization as a correspondent on the channel HLN.

References

MSNBC people
Place of birth missing (living people)
Year of birth missing (living people)
Living people